Cervelas may refer to:

Cervelat sausage
Cervelas de Lyon
the rackett